The first postage stamps marked Jersey were issued during the occupation of the island by the Germans during World War II.

Later, Jersey used British regional stamps marked specifically for use in Jersey but valid for postage throughout the United Kingdom.

Jersey has issued its own stamps since 1 October 1969.

Since 2014, Jersey has also issued Post & Go stamps.

See also
Revenue stamps of Jersey

References

Further reading

Channel Islands & Jersey
 Beecken, Olaf. Eine Plattenstudie der Jersey 1d-Wappenmarke = A plating study of the Jersey 1d Arms. Koln: Forschungsgemeinschaft Kanalinseln & Insel Man (FGCI), 1986 68p.
 Danan, Yves Maxime. Les Émissions locales et affranchissements de guerre des îles de la Manche. Paris: "Le Monde des philatélistes", 1968 38p.
 Danan, Yves Maxime. Histoire Postale des îles de la Manche. Paris: "Le Monde des philatélistes", 1976/78. Comprising: Vol. 1: Les Affranchissements de guerre de 1870 à 1944; Vol. 2: La Libération, compléments depuis 1945, les conséquences de l'indépendance postale.
 Griggs, Ian. The 1942 Jersey 1/2d Arms: A Plating Study. Ilford: C.I.S.S. Publishing, 1982, 88p.
 Hesketh, J.G. Jersey Definitive & Booklet Panes, 1969-97: Study & Checklist. Ilford: C.I.S.S. Publishing, 1997 , 40p.
 Mohle, Heinz. Die Briefmarken von den Kanal-Inseln: Guernsey & Jersey, Deutsche Besetzung 1940-1945. Frankfurt am Main: Arbeitsgemeinschaft Neues Handbuch der Briefmarkenkunde e.V. im Bund Deutscher Philatelisten e.V., 1970 43p.
 Newport, William. The Airmails of the Channel Islands. Sidcup: Channel Islands Specialists' Society, 1957, 12p. 
 Newport, William. The Channel Islands: France mail services, 1683-1939. Sidcup: Channel Islands Specialists' Society, 1956, 20p. 
 Newport, William. Early Channel Islands postal history and notes on other material. Sidcup: Channel Islands Specialists' Society, 1958, 39p. 
 Newport, William. Stamps and Postal History of the Channel Islands. London: Heinemann, 1972 , 214p.
 Newport, William and John O. Simpson. Numeral obliterations and instructional marks of the Channel Islands. Sidcup: Channel Islands Specialists' Society, 1957, 12p. 
 Newport, William and John O. Simpson. Postal affairs during the German occupation of the Channel Islands 1940-1945. Sidcup: Channel Islands Specialists' Society, 1957, 32p.   
 Stanley Gibbons Channel Islands Specialised Catalogue of Stamps and Postal History. London: Stanley Gibbons, 1983 , 451p.
 Summers, Howard. Bibliography of the Philately and Postal History of the British Isles. Borehamwood: Howcom Services, 2020  210p.
 Wieneke, Michael. The German Field Post Office in the Channel Islands: communications of the military and of the civilian inhabitants through the German Field Post Service 1940-1945. Grouville, Jersey: The Channel Islands Occupation Society (Jersey Branch), 1981, 16p.

External links
 Jersey Post
 Lions, Leopards, Unicorns & Dragons: The first "Regional" stamps The British Postal Museum & Archive

Jersey
Communications in Jersey
Jersey